Sun Yat-sen University Station is a station on Line 8 of the Guangzhou Metro that started operations on 28June 2003. It is located under Xingang Road West and Lixin Road in the Haizhu District of Guangzhou. Its name is derived from the nearby Sun Yat-sen University.

Before the extension to both lines 2 and 8 opened in September 2010, this station ran as part of Line 2 as a single line from Wanshengwei to Sanyuanli.

Station layout

Exits

References

Railway stations in China opened in 2003
Guangzhou Metro stations in Haizhu District
Railway stations in China at university and college campuses